The Lesley Manyathela Golden Boot is an annual association football award presented by the Premier Soccer League to the leading goalscorer in the South African Premier Division. The award, colloquially known as the PSL Golden Boot or simply the Golden Boot, has been presented since the inception of the post-apartheid format of the league in 1996. It was named in 2003 in honour of Lesley Manyathela, a South African international footballer and former recipient of the award who died in a motor vehicle collision in August of that year.

Wilfred Mugeyi was the first recipient of the award after he scored 22 goals for Bush Bucks in the inaugural Premier Division season. He is one of five players to have scored 20 or more goals in a season alongside Pollen Ndlanya, Collins Mbesuma, Siyabonga Nomvethe and Peter Shalulile. Mbesuma holds the record for the most goals scored in a single campaign following his return of 25 goals for Kaizer Chiefs in the 2004–05 season. He was also the first player to have won the award more than once, having claimed the trophy for a second time during his spell with Mpumalanga Black Aces in 2016, while Shalulile equalled this record in 2022.

Bernard Parker holds the record for the fewest goals needed to win the award, with his return of 10 goals for Kaizer Chiefs in the 2013–14 season earning him the accolade. The award has only been shared twice in the Premier Division's history, an occurrence which first took place in the 2017–18 season after Rodney Ramagalela of Polokwane City and Percy Tau of Mamelodi Sundowns both ended the campaign on 11 goals. Players from Moroka Swallows and Kaizer Chiefs have won the award the most times, with each club having four unique winners.

Winners

Awards won by nationality

Awards by club

References

Premier Soccer League
African football trophies and awards
1997 establishments in South Africa